The canton of Outreau is a canton situated in the department of the Pas-de-Calais and in the Hauts-de-France region of northern France.

Geography 
The canton is organised around Outreau in the arrondissement of Boulogne-sur-Mer. The elevation varies from 0m to 96m at Équihen-Plage for an average elevation of 55m.

Population

Composition
At the French canton reorganisation which came into effect in March 2015, the canton was expanded from 2 to 11 communes:
Condette
Dannes
Équihen-Plage
Hesdigneul-lès-Boulogne
Hesdin-l'Abbé
Isques
Nesles
Neufchâtel-Hardelot
Outreau  
Saint-Étienne-au-Mont
Saint-Léonard

See also 
Cantons of Pas-de-Calais 
Communes of Pas-de-Calais 
Arrondissements of the Pas-de-Calais department

References

Outreau